El Dorado High School is an accredited comprehensive public secondary school located in El Dorado, Arkansas, United States. The high school serves students in grades 9 through 12 for the community of El Dorado and surrounding unincorporated communities in Union County, Arkansas. The school is administered by the El Dorado School District. Its principal is Sherry Hill. The school has won 26 state athletic championships.

Academics 
The assumed course of study for students follows the Smart Core curriculum developed by the Arkansas Department of Education (ADE). Students complete regular (core and elective) and career focus courses and exams, and may select Advanced Placement (AP) coursework and exams that provide an opportunity for college credit.

In 2011, El Dorado School District and its high school were recognized in the AP District of the Year Awards program in the College Board's 1st Annual Honor Roll. This consisted of 388 U.S. public school districts (two in Arkansas) that simultaneously achieved increases in access to AP courses for a broader number of students, and improved the rate at which their AP students earned scores of 3 or higher on an AP exam.

Campus history 
In March 2009 a new high school construction began; it was completed in June 2011. The new school is for 1,500 students and is a  two-story structure made of wood, masonry, concrete and steel. Located in the original 1920s oil field, the project included a 2,000 seat arena/gymnasium, 450-seat fine arts auditorium and seven classroom zones on a site totaling 62 acres.

Murphy Oil's $50 million gift to education in El Dorado set the wheels in motion for the new school.

The new EHS also includes more than 100 classrooms and instructional spaces, six dedicated computer labs, media center, theater with sloped and tiered lecture seating, basketball arena, 75-seat “black box” theatre, 13 science labs, “Main Street” circulation corridors and central octunda, and  student dining/commons with serving area.

Extracurricular activities 
The El Dorado High School mascot and athletic emblem is the wildcat, with purple and white serving as the school colors.

The El Dorado Wildcats and Ladycats compete in several interscholastic athletic activities, including football, cross country, baseball, girls' softball, basketball, golf, track & field, girls' volleyball, tennis, and soccer. In 2012–14, EHS was a member of the 6A Classification and the 7A/6A South Conference as administered by the Arkansas Activities Association.

Football
The El Dorado High School football team are ten-time state champions and are the 2009, 2010, 2011, 2013, and 2021 6A Arkansas State Champions, previously winning state football championships in 1924, 1932, 1933, 1942 and 1958. They made it to the 6A Arkansas State Finals in five out of the six years starting in 2008.

Basketball

Wildcat basketball
The boys' basketball team are two-time state basketball champions, having won title games in 1976 and 1982.

LadyCat basketball
At the conclusion of the 2011 LadyCat basketball season, the El Dorado LadyCat basketball team earned its first state championship in school history.

Golf 
The Wildcats boys’ golf team are one of the state's most successful as nine-time state golf champions, winning four consecutive titles (1950–53), three consecutive titles (1966–68), and titles in 1973, 1987, and 2020.

The girls' team also won the state championship in 2000, 2002, 2004, 2007, 2009 and 2010.

Swimming 
The boys' swimming team won its only state swimming championship in 1965.

Baseball
The 2012 Wildcats won the 6A State Championship.

Performing Arts

Theatre
Thespian Troupe 42 is one of the oldest International Thespian Society troupes in the world.

School description

School district details

Graduation rate: 77.1%
Dropout rate: 2.0%
Students per teacher: 14.0
Enrolled students in district: 4,643
Enrolled students in El Dorado High School: 1,368
Ranks 204 out of 278 high schools in Arkansas

Faculty details and student enrollment

Students and faculty
Total students enrolled: 1,368
Average student to teacher ratio: 12.8

Student gender breakdown
Males: 679 (49.6%)
Females: 689 (50.4%)

Free lunch eligibility breakdown
Eligible for reduced lunch: 90 (6.6%)
Eligible for free lunch: 621 (45.4%)

Student enrollment distribution by race / ethnicity

Notable alumni 
Donna Axum — Miss America 1964
Daniel Gafford — Washington Wizards center (NBA); 2017 Arkansas Gatorade Player of the Year
Glen Ray Hines — former professional football player (NFL)
Jim Mooty — former professional football player (NFL)
Schoolboy Rowe — former professional baseball player (MLB)
R. B. Sprague — artist; contemporary and realist painting
J. R. Williamson — former professional football player (NFL)

References

External links 

El Dorado Promise

1929 establishments in Arkansas
Educational institutions established in 1929
Public high schools in Arkansas
Schools in Union County, Arkansas
Buildings and structures in El Dorado, Arkansas